Stony Creek is a  long 2nd order tributary to Stewarts Creek in Surry County, North Carolina.

Variant names
According to the Geographic Names Information System, it has also been known historically as:
Goins Creek

Course 
Stony Creek rises about 0.5 miles northeast of Lambsburg, Virginia in Carroll County and then flows southeast into North Carolina and then southwest to join Stewarts Creek about 2 miles east of Crooked Oak, North Carolina.

Watershed 
Stony Creek drains  of area, receives about 48.6 in/year of precipitation, has a wetness index of 342.16, and is about 59% forested.

See also 
 List of Rivers of North Carolina
 List of Rivers of Virginia

References 

Rivers of Surry County, North Carolina
Rivers of Carroll County, Virginia
Rivers of North Carolina
Rivers of Virginia